In the 2013–14 season, the GasTerra Flames from Groningen competed in the Dutch Basketball League, the NBB Cup and the EuroChallenge. 

It was the second season under head coach Ivica Skelin. This season, Flames won its first "double" ever, after the team won the NBB Cup by beating ZZ Leiden in the final and beating SPM Shoeters Den Bosch 4–3 in the playoff finals to take the DBL title.

Players

Squad information

Notes:

Depth chart

Roster changes

In

Out

Preseason

Dutch Basketball League
Flags are the flags of the city of the teams.

Regular season

Playoffs

Qualifying

|}

Quarterfinals: BC Apollo

Semifinals: Zorg en Zekerheid Leiden

Finals: SPM Shoeters Den Bosch

EuroChallenge
Groningen played the EuroChallenge, which was the first time back in Europe since the 2011–12 season. The team wasn't able to reach the last 16, as the Flames were able to win just 2 out of 6 games.

References

External links
 Official website 

Donar (basketball club)
GasTerra